Edgewood High School is located in Ellettsville, Indiana. The school is the sole high school in the Richland-Bean Blossom Community School Corporation and opened in 1965, shortly after the school district consolidated Ellettsville and Stinesville schools.

Demographics
As of the 2014-15 school year, the school had an enrollment of 819 students and 46.0 classroom teachers (on an FTE basis), for a student–teacher ratio of 17.8:1. There were 193 students (23.6% of enrollment) eligible for free lunch and 43 (5.3% of students) eligible for reduced-cost lunch.

The demographic breakdown of the 748 students enrolled in 2012-2013 was:
Male - 52.3%
Female - 47.7%
Native American/Alaskan - 0.1%
Asian/Pacific islanders - 1.2%
Black - 1.3%
Hispanic - 2.4%
White - 92.0%
Multiracial - 3.0%

Additionally, 27.9% of the students were eligible for free or reduced lunch.

Athletics

The Edgewood Mustangs compete in the Western Indiana Conference of the Indiana High School Athletic Association (IHSAA).  The school colors are black, red and white. Currently offered boys' sports are cross country, football, soccer, tennis, basketball, swimming, wrestling, baseball, golf, and track. Currently offered girls' sports are cross country, golf, soccer, volleyball, basketball, swimming, softball, tennis , track and wrestling.

Marching Band 
The Marching Mustangs placed first in the 2018 Open Class C Indiana State School Music Association competition with their show "From the Ashes"  The Marching Mustangs also placed second in the 2019 Open Class C Indiana State School Music Association competition with their show "The Space Between". In 2021, they placed 3rd with their show “Out of the Woods.”. In 2022 the Marching Mustangs placed first in Open Class C Indiana State School Music Association competition with their show "Break Free"

See also
 List of high schools in Indiana

References

External links
 Official website

Public high schools in Indiana
Educational institutions established in 1964
Schools in Monroe County, Indiana
1964 establishments in Indiana